"I'm All Yours" is a 2012 song by Jay Sean

"I'm All Yours" may also refer to:
"I'm All Yours", a sketch from the 1950 musical Alive and Kicking
"I'm All Yours", a song by Rachael Lampa from Kaleidoscope
"I'm All Yours", a song by Kyla from album Not Your Ordinary Girl
I'm All Yours (film), a French film